Five warships of Sweden have been named Delfinen (Swedish for dolphins):

 , a warship launched in 1626.
 , a galley launched in 1713.
 , a submarine launched in 1914 and stricken 1930.
 , a Delfinen class submarine launched in 1934 and stricken in 1957.
 , a  launched in 1961 and stricken in 1993.

Swedish Navy ship names